Modern Wives (Swedish: Modärna fruar) is a 1932 Swedish drama film directed by Edvin Adolphson and starring Ivar Kåge, Margit Manstad and Elsa Carlsson. It was shot at the Valby Studios of Nordisk Film in Copenhagen. The film's sets were designed by the art director Christian Hansen.

Synopsis
Lola, the wife of Stockholm architect Georg Wall, returns to their apartment one day and announces she wants a divorce.

Cast
 Ivar Kåge as Georg Wall
 Margit Manstad as 	Lola Wall
 Edvin Adolphson as Tallén
 Elsa Carlsson as 	Ebba Tallén
 Olof Winnerstrand as 	Acke
 Oscar Byström as Wall Sr.
 Constance Byström as 	Mrs. Ekberg
 Einar Beyron as 	Refrängsångare
 Eivor Engelbrektsson as 	Ung dam
 Disa Gillis as 	Ung dam
 Ollars-Erik Landberg as 	Rockvaktmästare
 Otto Lington as Orkesterledare
 Tekla Sjöblom as 	Clara

References

Bibliography 
 Freiburg, Jeanne Ellen. Regulatory Bodies: Gendered Visions of the State in German and Swedish Cinema. University of Minnesota, 1994.

External links 
 

1932 films
Swedish drama films
1932 drama films
1930s Swedish-language films
Films directed by Edvin Adolphson
Swedish black-and-white films
Films set in Stockholm
1930s Swedish films